Eldred is a surname of Old English origin.

People of this surname
 Arthur Rose Eldred (1895–1951), American businessman and the first Eagle Scout
 Brad Eldred (born 1980), American baseball player
 Brick Eldred (1892–1976), American baseball player
 Cal Eldred (born 1967), American baseball player
 Dale Eldred (1933–1993), American sculptor
 Eric Eldred (born 1943), American businessman and plaintiff in the 2003 court case, Eldred v. Ashcroft
 Foss O. Eldred (1884–1956), American politician and Michigan Attorney General (1946)
 Janet Eldred, American professor and author
 John Eldred (1552–1632), English traveller and merchant
 John Eldred (MP) (1629–1717), Member of the Parliament of England for Harwich in 1689
 Mike Eldred, American guitarist and luthier
 Mike Eldred, American musical theater performer
 Pamela Eldred (born 1948), American beauty pageant winner, Miss America 1970
 Ted Eldred (1920–2005), Australian scuba gear designer
 Thomas Brownell Eldred (1903–1993), American painter and printmaker
 Thomas Eldred (1561–1624), English merchant and mariner
 William Eldred (1563–1646), English gunner

References